Vegueros is the name of a brand of premium cigars produced on the island of Cuba for Habanos SA.

History 

In 1961, the Francisco Donatién Factory in the Pinar del Río Province of Cuba began producing cigars for domestic consumption, in addition to the cigarettes it had been producing for years. These cigars were commonly rolled for national banquets and other public affairs and became colloquially known as Vegueros, after the farmers and field hands that work on Cuba's tobacco and sugar cane plantations. The first people outside of Cuba to become acquainted with these cigars were sight-seeing tourists on trips through Cuba's cigar tobacco-growing regions. In 1997, Habanos SA launched the cigars for export.

Vitolas in the Vegueros line

The following list of vitolas de salida (commercial vitolas) within the Vegueros marque lists their size and ring gauge in Imperial (and Metric), their vitolas de galera (factory vitolas), and their common name in American cigar slang.

Hand-made Vitolas
 Especial No. 1 - 7½" × 38 (191 × 15.08 mm), Laguito No. 1, a long panetela
 Especial No. 2 - 6" × 38 (152 × 15.08 mm), Laguito No. 2, a panetela
 Mareva - 5⅛" × 42 (130 × 16.67 mm), Mareva, a petit corona
 Seoane - 4⅞" × 33 (124 × 13.10 mm), Seoane, a small panetela

See also 
 Cigar brands

References

 Nee, Min Ron - An Illustrated Encyclopaedia of Post-Revolution Havana Cigars (2003, Reprinted: 2005),

External links
 Official website of Habanos S.A.

Habanos S.A. brands
1844 introductions